The Lighthouse of Alexandria, sometimes called the Pharos of Alexandria (Ancient Greek: ὁ Φάρος τῆς Ἀλεξανδρείας, contemporary Koine ), was a lighthouse built by the Ptolemaic Kingdom of Ancient Egypt, during the reign of Ptolemy II Philadelphus (280–247 BC). It has been estimated to have been at least  in overall height. One of the Seven Wonders of the Ancient World, for many centuries it was one of the tallest man-made structures in the world.

The lighthouse was severely damaged by three earthquakes between 956 and 1323 AD and became an abandoned ruin. It was the third-longest surviving ancient wonder, after the Mausoleum at Halicarnassus and the extant Great Pyramid of Giza, surviving in part until 1480, when the last of its remnant stones were used to build the Citadel of Qaitbay on the site.

In 1994, a team of French archaeologists dove into the water of Alexandria's Eastern Harbour and discovered some remains of the lighthouse on the sea floor. In 2016 the Ministry of State of Antiquities in Egypt had plans to turn submerged ruins of ancient Alexandria, including those of the Pharos, into an underwater museum.



Origin
Pharos was a small island located on the western edge of the Nile Delta. In 332 BC Alexander the Great founded the city of Alexandria on an isthmus opposite Pharos.
The etymology of “Pharos” is uncertain. The word became generalized in modern Greek (φάρος ‘fáros’), and was loaned into Italian (‘faro’) and French (‘phare’).

The east side of the mole became the Great Harbour, now an open bay; on the west side lay the port of Eunostos, with its inner basin Kibotos now vastly enlarged to form the modern harbour. Today's city development lying between the present Grand Square and the modern Ras el-Tin quarter is built on the silt which gradually widened and obliterated this mole. The Ras el-Tin promontory, where Ras el-Tin Palace was built in the 19th century, represents all that is left of the island of Pharos, the site of the lighthouse at its eastern point having been weathered away by the sea.

Construction

The lighthouse was constructed in the third century BC. After Alexander the Great died, the first Ptolemy (Ptolemy I Soter) declared himself king in 305 BC, and commissioned its construction shortly thereafter. The building was finished during the reign of his son, Ptolemy II Philadelphus, and took twelve years to complete at a total cost of 800 talents of silver. The light was produced by a furnace at the top, and the tower was said to have been built mostly with solid blocks of limestone and granite.

In his encyclopedic manuscript Geographica, Strabo, who visited Alexandria in the late first century BC, reported that Sostratus of Cnidus had a dedication to the "Saviour Gods" inscribed in metal letters on the lighthouse. Writing in the first century AD, Pliny the Elder stated in his Natural History that Sostratus was the architect, although this conclusion is disputed. In his second century AD educational treatise How to Write History, Lucian claimed that Sostratus hid his name under plaster which bore the name of Ptolemy, so that when the plaster eventually fell off, Sostratus's name would be visible in the stone.

The blocks of sandstone and limestone used in the construction of the lighthouse have been scientifically analysed in order to discover where they originated, with mineralogical and chemical analysis pointing to the Wadi Hammamat quarries, which are located in the desert to the east of Alexandria.

Height and description

Arab descriptions of the lighthouse are consistent despite it undergoing several repairs after earthquake damage. Given heights vary only fifteen percent from  , on a  square base.

The Arab authors indicate that the lighthouse was constructed from large blocks of light-coloured stone. The tower was made up of three tapering tiers: a lower square section with a central core; a middle octagonal section; and, at the top, a circular section. Al-Masudi wrote in the 10th century that the seaward-facing side featured an inscription dedicated to Zeus. Geographer Al-Idrisi visited the lighthouse in 1154 and noted openings in the walls throughout the rectangular shaft with lead used as a filling agent in between the masonry blocks at the base. He reckoned the total height of the lighthouse to be 300 dhira rashashl (162 m).

At its apex was a mirror which reflected sunlight during the day; a fire was lit at night. Extant Roman coins struck by the Alexandrian mint show that a statue of Triton was positioned on each of the building's four corners, and a  statue of Poseidon or Zeus stood atop.

The fullest description of the lighthouse comes from Arab traveler Abou Haggag Youssef Ibn Mohammed el-Balawi el-Andaloussi, who visited Alexandria in 1166 AD. Balawi provided description and measurement of the interior of the lighthouse's rectangular shaft. The inner ramp was described as roofed with masonry at 7 shibr (189 cm, 6.2 ft) noted as to allow two horsemen to pass at once. In clockwise rotation, the ramp held four stories with eighteen, fourteen, and seventeen rooms on the second, third, and fourth floors, respectively.

Balawi accounted the base of the lighthouse to be 45 ba (30 m, 100 ft) long on each side with connecting ramp 600 dhira (300 m, 984 ft) long by 20 dhira (10 m, 32 ft) wide. The octangle section is accounted at 24 ba (16.4 m, 54 ft) in width, and the diameter of the cylindrical section is accounted at 12.73 ba (8.7 m, 28.5 ft). The apex of the lighthouse's oratory was measured with diameter 6.4 ba (4.3 m 20.9 ft).

Late accounts of the lighthouse after the destruction by the 1303 Crete earthquake include Ibn Battuta, a Moroccan scholar and explorer, who passed through Alexandria in 1326 and 1349. Battuta noted that the wrecked condition of the lighthouse was then only noticeable by the rectangle tower and entrance ramp. He stated the tower to be 140 shibr (30.8 m, 101 ft) on either side. Battuta detailed Sultan An-Nasir Muhammad's plan to build a new lighthouse near the site of the collapsed one, but these went unfulfilled after the Sultan's death in 1341.

Destruction
The lighthouse was partially cracked and damaged by earthquakes in 796 and 951, followed by structural collapse in the earthquake of 956, and then again in 1303 and 1323. Earthquakes propagate from two well known tectonic boundaries, the African–Arabian and Red Sea Rift zones, respectively 350 and 520 km from the lighthouse's location. Documentation shows the 956 earthquake to be the first to cause structural collapse of the top 20+ metres of the construction.

Documented repairs after the 956 earthquake include the installment of an Islamic-style dome after the collapse of the statue that previously topped the monument. The most destructive earthquake in 1303 was an estimated intensity of VIII+ originating from the Greek island of Crete (280–350 km from Alexandria). The stubby remnant disappeared in 1480, when the then-Sultan of Egypt, Qaitbay, built a medieval fort on the larger platform of the lighthouse site using some of the fallen stone.

The 10th-century writer al-Mas'udi reports a legendary tale on the lighthouse's destruction, according to which at the time of Caliph Abd al-Malik ibn Marwan the Byzantines sent a eunuch agent, who adopted Islam, gained the Caliph's confidence and secured permission to search for hidden treasure at the base of the lighthouse. The search was cunningly made in such a manner that the foundations were undermined, and the Pharos collapsed. The agent managed to escape in a ship waiting for him.

Archaeological research and rediscovery

Gaston Jondet made in 1916 the first detailed description of the submerged ruins of the old port of Alexandria. He was followed by Raymond Weill in the same year, and by Sir Leopold Halliday Savile in 1940.

In 1968, the lighthouse was rediscovered. UNESCO sponsored an expedition to send a team of marine archaeologists, led by Honor Frost, to the site. She confirmed the existence of ruins representing part of the lighthouse. Due to the lack of specialized archaeologists and the area becoming a military zone, exploration was put on hold.

A team of French archaeologists led by Jean-Yves Empereur re-discovered the physical remains of the lighthouse in late 1994 on the floor of Alexandria's Eastern Harbour. He worked with cinematographer Asma el-Bakri who used a 35 mm camera to capture the first underwater pictures of the scattered remains of collapsed columns and statues. Empereur's most significant findings consisted of blocks of granite 49–60 tonnes in mass often broken into multiple pieces, 30 sphinxes, 5 obelisks and columns with carvings dating back to Ramses II (1279–1213 BC).

The cataloging of over 3,300 pieces was completed by Empereur and his team at the end of 1995 using a combination of photography and mapping. Thirty-six pieces of Empereur's granite blocks and other discoveries have been restored and are currently on display in Alexandria museums. Satellite imaging has revealed further remains. In the early 1990s, the underwater archaeologist Franck Goddio began exploration at the opposite side of the harbor from where Empereur's team had worked. 

Satellite and sonar imaging has revealed the additional remains of wharves, houses and temples which had all fallen into the Mediterranean sea as a result of earthquakes and other natural disasters. It is possible to go diving and see the ruins. The secretariat of the UNESCO Convention on the Protection of the Underwater Cultural Heritage is currently working with the Government of Egypt on an initiative to add the Bay of Alexandria (including the remains of the lighthouse) to a World Heritage List of submerged cultural sites.

Significance

Legend has it that the people of the island of Pharos were wreckers; hence, Ptolemy I Soter had the lighthouse built to help guide ships into port at night.

Pharos became the etymological origin of the word "lighthouse" in Greek (φάρος), many Romance languages such as French (phare), Italian and Spanish (faro) – and thence into Esperanto (faro) – Catalan, Romanian (far) and Portuguese (farol), as well as Swedish and Danish (fyr), and even some Slavic languages like Bulgarian (far). In French, Portuguese, Turkish, Serbian and Russian, a derived word means "headlight" (phare, farol, far, фар, фара).

Proposed reconstruction 
Since 1978 a number of proposals have been made to replace the lighthouse with a modern reconstruction. In 2015, the Egyptian government and the Alexandria governorate suggested building a skyscraper on the site of the lighthouse as part of the regeneration of the eastern harbour of Alexandria Port.

Pharos in culture

The lighthouse remains a civic symbol of the city of Alexandria and of the Alexandria Governorate with which the city is more or less coterminous. A stylised representation of the lighthouse appears on the flag and seal of the Governorate and on many public services of the city, including the seal of Alexandria University.

In architecture
It dates to the reign of Ptolemy II (285–246 BC), and is therefore likely to have been built at about the same time as the Alexandria Pharos.
 The design of minarets in many early Egyptian Islamic mosques followed a three-stage design similar to that of the Pharos, attesting to the building's broader architectural influence.
 The George Washington Masonic National Memorial, located in Alexandria, Virginia, is fashioned after the ancient Lighthouse.
A fictionalized version of the structure – known as the "Pharos Lighthouse" – serves as the park icon, centerpiece, and identifier of Universal's Islands of Adventure theme park, opened in 1999 at the Universal Orlando Resort. The real, functioning lighthouse resides in the park's Port of Entry area, recalling a literary, seaside explorers' marketplace of global architectural elements real, ancient, and imagined.

In literature

Julius Caesar, in his Civil Wars (Part III, 111–112), describes the Pharos and its strategic importance. Gaining control of the lighthouse helped him subdue Ptolemy XIII's armies (48 BC):
The Romano-Jewish historian Josephus (37 – c. 100 AD) describes it in his book The Jewish War (4.10.5) when he gives a geographical overview of Egypt.
It was described in the Zhu fan zhi ("Records of Foreign Peoples") by Zhao Rugua (1170–1228), a Chinese customs inspector for the southern port city of Quanzhou during the Song dynasty.
Ibn Battuta visited the lighthouse in 1326, finding "one of its faces in ruins," yet he could enter and noted a place for the guardian of the lighthouse to sit and many other chambers.  When he returned in 1349, he "found that it had fallen into so ruinous a condition that it was impossible to enter it or to climb up to the doorway."

See also
Tower of Hercules, a Roman lighthouse in Spain
Minar (Firuzabad)
List of tallest structures built before the 20th century

References 
Notes

Bibliography

 
 
 
 
 
 
 

Further reading
Harris, William V., and Giovanni Ruffini. 2004. Ancient Alexandria Between Egypt and Greece. Leiden: Brill.
Jordan, Paul. 2002. The Seven Wonders of the Ancient World. Harlow: Longman.
Polyzōidēs, Apostolos. 2014. Alexandria: City of Gifts and Sorrows: From Hellenistic Civilization to Multiethnic Metropolis. Chicago: Sussex Academic Press, 2014.
Thompson, Alice. 2002. Pharos. London: Virago.
Tkaczow, Barbara, and Iwona Zych. 1993. The Topography of Ancient Alexandria: An Archaeological Map. Warszawa: Zaklad Archeologii Śródziemnomorskiej, Polskiej Akadmii Nauk.

External links

World History Encyclopedia – Lighthouse of Alexandria
Description of Alexandria and the Pharos in the Zhu fan zhi
A frightening vision: on plans to rebuild the Alexandria Lighthouse 
PBS Nova program about the recovery of artifacts from the site

 
Buildings and structures completed in the 3rd century BC
Buildings and structures demolished in the 14th century
1968 archaeological discoveries
Buildings and structures in Alexandria
Demolished buildings and structures in Egypt
Hellenistic architecture
Lighthouses completed in the 2nd century
Alexandria
Ptolemaic Alexandria
Transport in Alexandria
Former towers
Seven Wonders of the Ancient World